Associazione Sportiva Dilettantistica Anziolavinio is an Italian association football club located in Anzio, Lazio.

It currently plays in Serie D.

History
The club was founded in 1990 after the merger between two clubs either played in Serie D: A.S. Anzio (founded in 1924) and A.C Lavinio.

Color and badge
Its colors are white and blue.

References

External links
Official homepage

Football clubs in Italy
Football clubs in Lazio
Association football clubs established in 1990
1990 establishments in Italy
Sport in the Metropolitan City of Rome Capital